An American Trilogy is a box set of three remastered albums by Mickey Newbury recorded between 1969 and 1973 at Cinderella Sound studio, in Madison, Tennessee, alongside an additional album of rare and unreleased recordings, entitled Better Days. It was released in 2011 on Saint Cecilia Knows, in association with the Newbury family and their label Mountain Retreat.  The box includes the albums Looks Like Rain (originally released on Mercury records in 1969), Frisco Mabel Joy and Heaven Help The Child (released, respectively, in 1971 and 1973, both on Elektra records). All three albums have been remastered for the first time on CD from the original master tapes, long thought to have been destroyed in a fire.

Albums included 
 Looks Like Rain (1969)
 Frisco Mabel Joy (1971)
 Heaven Help The Child (1973)
 Better Days (2011)

Credits 
 Jessica Thompson & Steve Rosenthal – mastering engineers
 Brian Thorn & Steve Rosenthal – remix engineers ("Looks Like Rain")
 Chris Campion – box set producer
 Chris Campion & Susan Archie – art direction and design
 Masumi Kobayashi – illustration
 Chris Campion, Ben Fong Torres, Kris Kristofferson, Kenny Rogers, Will Oldham – liner notes

References

External links 
 

Mickey Newbury albums
2011 albums